The 2016 Mayo Senior Football Championship was the 115th edition of the Mayo GAA's premier gaelic football tournament for senior clubs in County Mayo, Ireland. Sixteen teams compete with the winner representing Mayo in the Connacht Senior Club Football Championship. The championship starts with a group stage and progresses to a knock out stage. The winners receive the Paddy Moclair Cup.

Castlebar Mitchels were the defending champions after they defeated rivals Breaffy in the 2015 final. They successfully defended their title to claim a "2-in-a-row" and their 30th overall when they defeated Knockmore 3-13 to 0-10 in McHale Park on 29 October 2016.

Ballyhaunis were relegated to the 2017 I.F.C.

This year Hollymount-Carramore made their debut in the senior grade after just 6 seasons in existence since the amalgamation of the Hollymount and Carramore clubs in 2011 when claiming the Mayo Intermediate Football Championship title. Hollymount was founded back in 1954, while Carramore was re-formed in 1975. Hollymount have won back-to-back county senior titles (1990-1) and their last senior championship came in 1994. Carramore's greatest achievement came in 1982 when they beat Glenamoy in the county junior final on a unique scoreline of 0-4 to 0-0. They also won an O’Mara Cup in 1985 – ironically, defeating Hollymount in the final.

Promoted to SFC from IFC in 2015 

 Hollymount-Carramore – (Intermediate Champions)

Relegated from SFC to IFC in 2015 
 Shrule-Glencorrib (loser of relegation final)

Group stage 
All 16 teams enter the competition at this stage. The top 2 teams in each group go into the quarter-finals while the bottom team of each group will enter a Relegation Playoff. For all group matches the home team is named first.

Group A 

Round 1
 Breaffy 1-9, 0-6 Garrymore, 14/5/2016,
 Claremorris 1-8, 3-8 Davitts, 14/5/2016,

Round 2
 Garrymore 1-13, 1-10 Davitts, 25/6/2016,
 Breaffy 3-15, 1-11 Claremorris, 26/6/2016,

Round 3
 Davitts 0-11, 2-11 Breaffy, 8/10/2016,
 Claremorris 3-10, 2-13 Garrymore, 8/10/2016,

Group B 

Round 1
 Ballintubber 3-3, 0-11 Hollymount-Carramore, 14/5/2016,
 Aghamore 3-15, 0-8 Charlestown Sarsfields, 14/5/2016,

Round 2
 Ballintubber 2-17, 1-4 Charlestown Sarsfields, 25/6/2016,
 Aghamore 1-13, 0-9 Hollymount-Carramore, 25/6/2016,

Round 3
 Charlestown Sarsfields 1-13, 2-9 Hollymount-Carramore, 8/10/2016,
 Aghamore 0-8, 2-10 Ballintubber, 8/10/2016,

Group C 

Round 1
 Castlebar Mitchels 3-13, 0-9 Crossmolina Deel Rovers, 14/5/2016,
 Ballina Stephenites 4-12, 1-5 Ballinrobe, 15/5/2016,

Round 2
 Castlebar Mitchels 5-10, 0-9 Ballinrobe, 25/6/2016,
 Crossmolina Deel Rovers 1-7, 0-7 Ballina Stephenites, 25/6/2016,

Round 3
 Crossmolina Deel Rovers 4-16, 2-7 Ballinrobe, 8/10/2016,
 Castlebar Mitchels 1-15, 0-11 Ballina Stephenites, 8/10/2016,

Group D 

Round 1
 Ballaghaderreen 1-12, 0-12 Ballyhaunis, 14/5/2016,
 Kiltane 1-4, 0-7 Knockmore, 14/5/2016,

Round 2
 Ballaghaderreen 5-11, 2-9 Kiltane, 26/6/2016,
 Knockmore 2-17, 0-5 Ballyhaunis, 26/6/2016,

Round 3
 Knockmore 1-12, 2-7 Ballaghaderreen, 8/10/2016,
 Kiltane 2-10, 0-9 Ballyhaunis, 8/10/2016,

Knock-Out Stage

Last Eight

Quarter-finals

Semi-finals

Final

Relegation Playoffs

Relegation Semi-Finals 

 Claremorris 0-11, 2-5 Ballyhaunis, Charlestown, 16/10/2016,
 Hollymount/Carramore 0-15, 1-6 Ballinrobe, Ballindine, 16/10/2016,
 Claremorris 1-15, 1-7 Ballyhaunis, Connacht COE, 4/12/2016, (Replay)

Relegation Final 
 Ballinrobe 1-11, 0-6 Ballyhaunis, Ballindine, 11/12/2016,

Championship statistics

Miscellaneous

 Hollymount-Carramore made their debut in the senior grade.

Connacht Senior Club Football Championship

References 

Mayo Senior Football Championship
Mayo Senior Football Championship